Always You is the fourth studio album by singer James Ingram, released in 1993 on Qwest Records. The album got to No. 27 on the Blues & Soul Top British Soul Albums chart.

Overview
Always You was executively produced by Benny Medina.

The album cut, "Someone Like You", reached No. 33 on the Billboard Adult Contemporary chart.

Critical reception

David Wild of Rolling Stone gave a three out of five stars rating exclaiming "A great popular singer who suffers from a lack of image, James Ingram is unlikely to change that position much with the release of "Always You," his new album that finds him working with producers Keith Thomas (who made Amy Grant a major pop act), the great Philly soulman Thom Bell and Maurice White of Earth, Wind & Fire fame. This strange combo works, though. Sonia Murray of The Atlanta Journal-Constitution said "James Ingram, a well-oiled machine in the hit-making factory, has assembled another album ready for much airplay. "Always You" is consistently him. A collection of ballads and massage-like mid-tempo songs, his latest effort shows that Mr. Ingram knows what works for him and why. Thanks to his painstaking care with every lyric, even gushy cuts like "Always You" and "A Baby's Born" come off as convincing." Phyl Garland of Stereo Review exclaimed "Others might shout, bark, growl, scream and rap their way through recordings, but James Ingram has such a superb voice that it's enough to simply hear him sing. Building on the tradition of soul crooning established in earlier decades, he is presented here in tastefully fashioned romantic settings that permit him to display his irresistible way with a
ballad. There is no huffing, puffing, or grunting. Instead, Ingram is permitted to cast a spell with his velvety voice as he interprets several quality songs, including the pensive A Baby's Born, the socially aware Sing for the Children, and the pretty Any Kind of Love. While Ingram
is a masterly balladeer, this does not mean that he is technically limited. Without disrupting the mood he has created, he deftly weaves in
some dazzling vocal effects a la Al Jarreau or
George Benson. He does so without ever breaking his cool, and that is the mark of a real master."  Cathy Carmode of the Deseret News wrote "Ingram's new collection is a keeper because it's so listenable, not because any of the songs is particularly remarkable. Albums so consistently pleasant and enjoyable are ones that shouldn't be let go.
When I want to complete a task or spend some time with a friend or sweetheart, and want some soothing, pleasant background music, I don't want to have to get up and fast forward through a song that breaks that mood. Always You is appropriate for just that sort of purpose, if not for more intent listening." With a 3.5 out of 5 stars rating Greg Simms of the Dayton Daily News found that "James Ingram teamed with Thom Bell and Benny Medina to produce Always You, and Maurice White, the mind behind Earth, Wind and Fire, lent a hand. But all that seems to amount to is a little embellishment on this album. Indeed, helping Ingram produce a group of songs is like helping Carl Lewis run the 100 -meter dash. Ingram is a welcome throwback to the days when crooners just stepped up to the microphone and let their voices go. The idea was just to sing sweetly and let the audience appreciate a fine voice. That's what Always You is all about." Simms also added "Ingram treats his listeners right. There is no way to go wrong with Always You."

Track listing

Production 
 Producers – Keith Thomas (Tracks 1–4); James Ingram and Thom Bell (Tracks 5–7, 9 & 10); Maurice White (Track 8).
 Executive Producers – James Ingram, Thom Bell and Benny Medina.
 Production Coordination – Todd Moore (Tracks 1–4)
 Engineers – Bill Whittington (Tracks 1–4); Clark Germain (Tracks 5–7, 9 & 10); Paul Klingberg (Track 8).
 Assistant Engineers – Todd Moore (Tracks 1–4); Mike Corbett (Track 2), Roy Gamble (Track 4); Mark Guilbeault (Tracks 5–7, 9 & 10); Mark Fergesen (Track 8).
 Mixing – Bill Whittington (Tracks 1–4), Mick Guzauski (Tracks 5–10).
 Mix Assistant – Jeff Graham (Tracks 5–10)
 Mastered By Bernie Grundman at Bernie Grundman Mastering (Hollywood, CA).
 Management – AMG International

Personnel 
 James Ingram – lead vocals, backing vocals (4–6, 8, 10), keyboard programming (5–7, 9), arrangements (10)
 Keith Thomas – arrangements (1–4), keyboards (1–4), bass programming (1–4), drum programming (1, 3, 4)
 Thom Bell – keyboards (5–7, 9, 10), arrangements and conductor (5–7, 9, 10)
 Wayne Linsey – keyboards (5–7, 9, 10), keyboard programming (5–7, 9), drum programming (10)
 Bill Meyers – keyboards (8), arrangements (8)
 Mike McKnight – keyboard programming (8), bass programming (8)
 Jerry McPherson – guitar (1, 4)
 Paul Jackson Jr. – guitar solo (5)
  Carlos Rios – guitar (5–7, 9, 10)
 Michael Thompson – guitar (8)
 Jimmie Lee Sloas – bass samples (4)
 Larry Kempel – bass guitar (5–7, 9, 10)
 Mark Hammond – drum programming (1, 2, 4)
 Ricky Lawson – drums (5–7, 9)
 Enzo Todesco – drums (8)
 Farrell Morris – chimes (3), timpani (3)
 Lenny Castro – percussion (5–7, 9, 10)
 Gerald Albright – saxophone (8)
 Jeremy Lubbock – string arrangements and conductor (3)
 The Nashville String Machine – strings (3)
 Gary Herbig – flute (5–7, 9, 10)
 Dan Higgins – flute (5, 6, 10)
 Larry Williams – flute (7, 9)
 George Bohanon – horn (5, 6, 10)
 Rick Culver – horn (5, 6, 10)
 David Duke – horn (5, 6, 10)
 Gary Grant – horn (5–7, 9, 10)
 Jerry Hey – horn (5–7, 9, 10)
 Alan Kaplan – horn (5, 6)
 Lew McCreary – horn (5, 6)
 Brad Warnaar – horn (5, 6, 10)
 Jim Atkinson – horn (7, 9, 10)
 Greg Williams – horn (7, 9, 10)
 Mark Adams – horn (10)
 Charles Loper – horn (10)
 Bill Reichenbach Jr. – horn (10)
 Gayle Levant – harp (5–7, 9, 10)
 Robert Becker – strings (5–7, 9, 10)
 Robert Brosseau – strings (5–7, 9, 10)
 Kenneth Burwood Hoy – strings (5–7, 9, 10)
 Larry Corbett – strings (5–7, 9, 10)
 Joel Derouin – strings (5–7, 9, 10)
 Bruce Dukov – strings (5–7, 9, 10)
 Henry Ferber – strings (5, 6, 10)
 Joe Goodman – strings (5–7, 9, 10)
 Diana Halprin – strings (5–7, 9, 10)
 Pat Johnson – strings (5–7, 9, 10)
 Karen Jones – strings (5–7, 9, 10)
 Suzie Katayama – strings (5–7, 9, 10)
 Janet Lakatos – strings (5–7, 9, 10)
 Michael Markman – strings (5–7, 9, 10)
 Dan Neufeld – strings (5, 6, 10)
 Sid Page – strings (5–7, 9, 10)
 Sheldon Sanov – strings (5–7, 9, 10)
 Kwihee Shamban – strings (5–7, 9, 10)
 Evan Wilson – strings (5–7, 9, 10)
 Hershel Wise – strings (5–7, 9, 10)
 Rick Gerding – strings (7, 9, 10)
 Endre Granat – strings (7, 9, 10)
 Brian Dembow – strings (10)
 Cindy Mizelle – backing vocals (1, 2, 4)
 Chris Rodriguez – backing vocals (1, 2, 4)
 Audrey Wheeler – backing vocals (1, 2, 4)
 Bob Bailey – backing vocals (3)
 Guy Penrod – backing vocals (3)
 Mervyn Warren – backing vocals (3)
 Chris Willis – backing vocals (3)
 Alvin Chea – backing vocals (4)
 Phillip Ingram – backing vocals (5, 6)
 Carolyn Perry – backing vocals (5, 6)
 Darlene Perry – backing vocals (5, 6)
 Lori Perry – backing vocals (5, 6)
 Phil Perry – backing vocals (5, 6)
 Sharon Perry – backing vocals (5, 6)
 The Aquarian Brothers – backing vocals (7, 9)
 Maurice White – backing vocals (8)
 The Boys Choir of Harlem – backing vocals (9)
 Lynne Fiddmont-Linsey – backing vocals (10)

Additional Credits
 Art Direction – Jeri Heiden
 Design – Jeri Heiden and Laurie Griffin
 Photography – Mark Hanauer
 Stylist – Cecille Parker

Charts

References

James Ingram albums
1993 albums
Albums produced by Thom Bell
Qwest Records albums
Warner Records albums